Who Never Lived is a 2006 Polish drama film directed by Andrzej Seweryn. It was entered into the 28th Moscow International Film Festival.

Cast
 Michał Żebrowski as Father Jan
 Joanna Sydor as Marta
 Robert Janowski as Pawel
 Teresa Marczewska as Jan's Mother
 Stefan Burczyk as Priest
 Andrzej Zarnecki as Bishop
 Cezary Iber as Krzysztof
 Natalia Rybicka as Kasia
 Mateusz Banasiuk as Mateusz
 Wojciech Mecwaldowski as Artur
 Joanna Liszowska as Elka
 Boguslaw Parchimowicz as Jarek

References

External links
 

2006 films
2006 drama films
Polish drama films
2000s Polish-language films
Films scored by Jan A. P. Kaczmarek